Mount Bowers is a peak,  high, standing  south-southeast of Mount Buckley, at the head of the Beardmore Glacier. It was named by the British Antarctic Expedition, 1910–13 for Lieutenant Henry R. Bowers, who accompanied Robert F. Scott to the South Pole and lost his life on the return journey.

References 

Mountains of the Ross Dependency
Shackleton Coast